Restless is the seventh full-length studio release from Maryland-based soul band Starpoint.  It was released in 1985 and was produced by the team of Keith Diamond & Lionel Job (Diamond is also credited for writing two and co-writing four more of the eight selections here).  It featured their biggest pop chart hit in the song "Object of My Desire," which peaked at number 25 in 1985.  Follow-up singles included "What You Been Missin'," which cracked the R&B top ten, and the title track, which nearly became another R&B top ten hit.

Additional information
Signing with Elektra in the early/mid-1980s, Starpoint veered more toward the pop side of R&B, while still maintaining the funk elements that originally characterized their sound. Their 1985 LP Restless yielded their sole top 40 pop single, "Object of My Desire," and the R&B/Urban singles "Restless" and "What You've Been Missin'."  The non-single tracks (as always) were just as strong, with "Emotions" and "One more Night" being the standouts, in addition to a song that had a lot of pop potential, "See the Light".

Track listing
"Object of My Desire" (Kayode Adeyemo, Ernesto Phillips, Keith Diamond) 5:00
"One More Night" (Diamond, E. Phillips, Lionel Job) 4:05
"Emotions" (Orlando Phillips) 4:27
"See the Light" (Diamond) 4:20
"Till the End of Time" (Diamond) 5:05
"Don't Take Your Love Away" (E. Phillips) 4:14
"Restless" (Diamond, E. Phillips) 3:49
"What You Been Missin'" (Diamond, Jolyon Skinner) 5:10

Personnel

Starpoint
Renée Diggs: Female Vocals
Kayode Adeyemo: Male Vocals
George Phillips: Keyboards, Backing Vocals
Ernesto Phillips: Guitars, Keyboards, Backing Vocals
Orlando Phillips: Bass, Saxophone, Keyboards, Backing Vocals
Gregory Phillips: Drums, Percussion, Backing Vocals

Additional Personnel
Keith Diamond: Fairlight & Synthesizer Programming, Keyboards, Backing Vocals
Ned Liben (aka EBN): Additional Fairlight programming
Lionel Job, Bashiri Johnson: Additional Percussion
Jeff Smith: Saxophone on "One More Night"
Cindy Mizelle: Backing Vocals on "One More Night" 
James Woodley: Backing Vocals on "See the Light"
Barry Eastmond: Keyboards on "Til the End of Time"
Terry Silverlight: Drums, Percussion

Production
Produced by Keith Diamond (for Rough Cut Productions, Inc.) and Lionel Job (for Lionel Job, Inc.)
Recording Engineers: Bob Rosa & Tom Lord-Alge; assisted by Jim Dougherty, Pete Robbins & Steve Peck
Mix Engineers: Bob Rosa, Keith Diamond, Lionel Job
Mastered by Ted Jensen

Charts

Weekly charts

Year-end charts

References

External links
Starpoint- Restless at Discogs.com.
Production information at Discogs.com.

1985 debut albums
Elektra Records albums
Asylum Records albums